LCN can refer to:

La Coka Nostra, a hiphop music group
 La Cosa Nostra ("this thing of ours"): Italian or Italian-émigré organized crime syndicates, including:
American Mafia
Sicilian Mafia
Landing Craft Navigation, a type of watercraft used in World War 2 for surveying landing sites for troops from landing craft
 Law Centres Network, the peak body for law centres in the UK
Le Canal Nouvelles, a television channel in Quebec, Canada
 Lincoln railway station, whose station code is LCN
 Load Classification Number, also known as the Pavement Classification Number, a measure of the bearing strength of an airport runway
Logical channel number (aka virtual channel), channel numbers used on radio and television sets 
Logical cluster number of a volume or logical drive of a computer
 London Centre for Nanotechnology, a nanotechnology research institute in London, England
Low copy number, a DNA profiling technique
 Lcn. (× Laeliocatanthe), a hybrid genus of orchids, corresponding to Cattleya × Laelia × Guarianthe
Balcanoona Airport, IATA airport code "LCN"

See also 
 Library of Congress Control Number (LCCN)